Acala, Texas is a ghost town in Hudspeth County, Texas, 34 miles northwest of Sierra Blanca and 54 miles southeast of El Paso, with a current population around 25. Acala is located on Highway 20. Acala was named for acala cotton, a type of cotton produced in Mexico.

History
The area was settled in the early 20th century before a post office was established in 1925. In 1929, the population had doubled to 100 from its 50 residents just a few years before. It peaked again in the late '50s, at 100 people, but began to fall, once again. Only 25 people called Acala home by the 1970s. Since then, it has remained at that size.

Education
It is in the Fort Hancock Independent School District. Fort Hancock High School is the district's comprehensive high school.

References

Populated places in Hudspeth County, Texas
Ghost towns in West Texas